The 2009 World Baseball Classic (WBC) was an international baseball competition. It began on March 5 and finished March 23.

Unlike in 2006, when the round-robin format of the first two rounds led to some eliminations being decided by run-difference tiebreakers, the first two rounds of the 2009 edition were modified double-elimination format. The modification was that the final game of each bracket was winner-take-all, even if won by the team emerging from the loser's bracket, although that game only affected seeding, as two teams always advanced from each bracket.

The biggest surprise in the first round was the Netherlands, which twice defeated the Dominican Republic in Pool D to advance.  The second round saw the two Pool A teams (South Korea and Japan) defeat the two Pool B teams (Cuba and Mexico) while the two Pool C teams (Venezuela and the United States) defeated the two Pool D teams (Puerto Rico and the Netherlands). South Korea and Japan then advanced to the final game, playing each other for the fifth time in the tournament (split 2–2 up to that time), and Japan emerged victorious for the second straight Classic, winning the final game 5–3 in 10 innings.

For the second straight Classic, Daisuke Matsuzaka was named the Most Valuable Player of the tournament.

Format
As was the case for the 2006 tournament, the sixteen teams were split into four pools of four teams each. Whereas previously the teams played in round-robin competition in the first two rounds, this time they took part in a double-elimination format, similar to the U.S. College World Series sponsored by the NCAA. Under the new format, teams were only guaranteed to play two games. This change was made to eliminate the complicated tiebreaking procedures, which were required for one of the pools in each of the first two rounds in 2006.

After the first round, the tournament was held in the U.S. The top two teams from each of the four pools—seeded from the final game in their respective pools—went to the second round, with the teams from Pools A and B meeting at Petco Park in San Diego for Pool 1, and the teams in Pools C and D playing at Dolphin Stadium in Miami Gardens for Pool 2. Again, both pools made use of double-elimination to determine the teams qualifying for the semifinals. In another change from 2006, the four qualifying teams crossed over for the semifinals, with the winner of each pool playing against the runner-up from the other pool. The championship round process was otherwise unchanged, with each semifinal being a single elimination match, the victors meeting in the final to determine the tournament champion. All three championship round games were held at Dodger Stadium in Los Angeles.

In the final, the team with the higher winning percentage of games in the tournament were to be the home team. If the teams competing in the final had identical winning percentages in the tournament, then World Baseball Classic, Inc. (WBCI) would conduct a coin flip or draw to determine the home team.

Rosters

Each participating national federation had a deadline of January 19, 2009 to submit a 45-man provisional roster. Final rosters of 28 players, which was required to include a minimum of 13 pitchers and two catchers, were submitted on February 24. If a player on the submitted roster was unable to play, usually due to injury, he could be substituted at any time before the start of the tournament. While rosters could not be changed during a round of competition, a team that advanced to a later round could change its roster for the later round.

Venues
Seven stadiums were used during the tournament:

Pools composition
The 16 teams that participated in the 2006 World Baseball Classic were all invited back for the 2009 tournament. The World Baseball Classic, Inc. (WBCI) changed the members of each pool as compared with the 2006 Classic, however, except for Pool A. There was no official qualifying competition.

Note: Numbers in parentheses indicate positions in the IBAF World Rankings at the time of the tournament.

First round

Pool A

|}

Pool B

|}

Pool C

|}

Pool D

|}

Second round

Pool 1

|}

Pool 2

|}

Championship round

Semifinals

|}

Final

|}

Final standings
Organizer WBCI has no interest in the final standings and did not compute. So, it was calculated by IBAF for the IBAF Men's Baseball World Rankings.

In the final standings, ties were to be broken in the following order of priority:

 The team allowing the fewest runs per nine innings (RA/9) in all games;
 The team allowing the fewest earned runs per nine innings (ERA) in all games;
 The team with the highest batting average (AVG) in all games;

Attendance
801,408 (avg. 20,549; pct. 54.5%)

First round
453,374 (avg. 18,891; pct. 55.6%)
Pool A – 170,112 (avg. 28,352; pct. 67.5%)
Pool B – 92,665 (avg. 15,444; pct. 59.4%)
Pool C – 103,899 (avg. 17,317; pct. 35.0%)
Pool D – 86,698 (avg. 14,450; pct. 79.1%)

Second round
206,180 (avg. 17,182; pct. 42.3%)
Pool 1 – 91,783 (avg. 15,297; pct. 35.8%)
Pool 2 – 114,397 (avg. 19,066; pct. 49.4%)

Championship round
141,854 (avg. 47,285; pct. 84.4%)
Semifinals – 87,008 (avg. 43,504; pct. 77.7%)
Final – 54,846 (avg. 54,846; pct. 97.9%)

2009 All-World Baseball Classic team
Note: The tournament Most Valuable Player was Daisuke Matsuzaka.

Statistics leaders

Batting

* Minimum 2.7 plate appearances per game

Pitching

* Minimum 0.8 innings pitched per game
** González is tied with 17 others with a 0.00 ERA but he pitched the most innings with 9.2

Additional rules
As was the case for the 2006 Classic, several rules were announced for the 2009 tournament that modified the existing rules for international baseball set out by the IBAF.

Once again there were limits on the number of pitches thrown in a game, though the limits themselves were changed from the previous tournament:

70 pitches in First Round (up from 65 in 2006)
85 pitches in Second Round (up from 80 in 2006)
100 pitches in Championship Round (up from 95 in 2006)

If a pitcher reached his limit during an at bat, he was allowed to finish pitching to the batter, but was removed from the game at the end of the at bat.

A 30–pitch outing needed to be followed by one day off, and a 50–pitch outing by four days off. No one would be allowed to pitch on three consecutive days. As the championship round was played over three consecutive days, a so-called "pitcher rest equalization" rule was added: a pitcher making 30 or more pitches in a semifinal was ineligible to pitch in the final. This negated an advantage the winners of the first semifinal would have had in the final.

A mercy rule came into effect when one team led by either fifteen runs after five innings, or ten runs after seven innings in the first two rounds.

Instant replay was also available to umpires during the tournament. As was introduced in Major League Baseball during the 2008 season, replays were only used to adjudicate on home run decisions, to determine whether the ball was fair or foul, over the fence or not, and the impact of fan interference.

An alternative version of the IBAF's extra inning rule was also introduced. If after 12 innings the score was still tied, each half inning thereafter would have started with runners on second and first base. The runners would have been the eighth and ninth hitters due in that inning respectively. For example, if the number five hitter was due to lead off the inning, the number three hitter would have been on second base, and the number four hitter on first base. However, this rule was never actually employed in this year's Classic, as the two extra-inning games in the tournament ended prior to a 13th inning.

All base coaches were required to wear protective helmets, in the aftermath of the death of Mike Coolbaugh and participating teams were required to announce the next day's starting pitcher. Additionally, a modified early termination rule was in effect for the first two rounds; had a team been ahead by 15 or more runs after five innings or ten or more runs after seven or eight innings, the game ended at that point.

Prize money
USD 14,000,000

By final standings
Champions – USD 2,700,000
Runners-up – USD 1,700,000
Semifinalists – USD 1,200,000 (x 2 teams)
Eliminated in Second Round – USD 700,000 (x 4 teams)
Eliminated in First Round – USD 300,000 (x 8 teams)

Bonus for pool winners
First Round – USD 300,000 (x 4 teams)
Second Round – USD 400,000 (x 2 teams)

Media coverage
In the United States, ESPN and the MLB Network shared the rights, with ESPN broadcasting 23 of the games, including the Finals, while MLB Network showed the remaining 16. Spanish language telecasts in the U.S. were handled by ESPN Deportes telecasting all games. Internationally, it was broadcast to 167 countries by ESPN International.

In Canada, Rogers Sportsnet aired all 39 games.

In the Dominican Republic, CDN (Cadena de Noticias) and CDN2 broadcast all games live (except for games played in Tokyo, shown on tape delay)

In Japan, J Sports broadcast all 39 games. TV Asahi (Round 1) and TBS (Round 2 and Finals) broadcast all games featuring Japan. For all games featuring Japan, they gained viewing ratings of at least 20%. The final game gained ratings in the range 30-45%.

Video games
World Baseball Classic 2009 has licensed three video games, all only released in Japan: Pro Yakyuu Spirits 6, Baseball Heroes 2009
and Jikkyou Pawafuru Major League 2009

References

External links
Official website

 
World Baseball Classic
World Baseball Classic
March 2009 sports events